This is a record of Germany and West Germany's results at the FIFA World Cup. For Germany's World Cup history, FIFA considers only the teams managed by the Deutscher Fußball-Bund, comprising three periods: Germany (during Nazi era), West Germany and reunified Germany. The Germany national football team is one of the most successful national teams at the FIFA World Cup, winning four titles, earning second-place and third-place finishes four times each and one fourth-place finish.  Germany's 12 podium finishes (3rd place or better) in 20 tournaments add up to at least three more than any other nation. In addition, Germany are the only team which has stood on the podium at least once during the completed decades in which at least one tournament was held (1930s, 1950s, 1960s, 1970s, 1980s, 1990s, 2000s and 2010s). Along with Argentina, Brazil and Spain, they are one of the four national teams to win outside their continental confederation, with the title of the 2014 FIFA World Cup in South America. The team qualified for every FIFA World Cup tournament they have entered (20 out of the 22), the second most frequent, and only failed to reach the quarter-finals three times, in 1938, 2018, and 2022. With this, Germany's 8th place or better (quarter-finals) in 17 out of 20 tournaments (85%) ranks highest in FIFA World Cup finals history. It makes Germany the best team in the history of the tournament in terms of final positions, if points were awarded proportionally for a title, runner-up finish, third-place finish, semi-final and quarter-final appearances.

Records  
1930–1938 as  →  → 
1950–1990 as 
1994–present as 

 Champions   Runners-up   Third place   Tournament played fully or partially on home soil

Winning World Cups

FIFA World Cup finals

1954 World Cup Final v Hungary

Only 14 days before the final, West Germany played the favoured Hungarian Golden Team in the first round of the tournament and suffered a 3–8 loss, their highest World Cup defeat to this day. In the final, Hungary was up by two goals after only eight minutes, so it came as a surprise that the West German team not only quickly equalized but turned the game around in the 84th minute with a goal scored by Helmut Rahn.

1966 World Cup Final v England

The strongly contested game between host nation England and West Germany went into extra time after a score of 2-2 after 90 minutes. Geoff Hurst's goal in the 101st minute is one of the most controversial in football history: His shot bounced off the cross-bar onto the ground and back away from the goal. After a brief discussion with the Soviet linesman Tofiq Bahramov, referee Gottfried Dienst awarded the goal. With the West Germans forced to press for the equalizer, Hurst converted a counterattack in the 120th minute and decided the match for England.

1974 World Cup Final v the Netherlands

West Germany reached the final as host nation in 1974 and were facing their neighbours and rivals from the Netherlands. After an early penalty scored by Johan Neeskens, West Germany turned the game around to win their second World Cup trophy.

1982 World Cup Final v Italy

Paul Breitner became only the third player in World Cup history to have scored in two separate finals, but only after the Italians had already taken a 3–0 lead after 81 minutes.

1986 World Cup Final v Argentina

With the highest attendance ever at a FIFA World Cup final, West Germany faced Argentina in Mexico City. Although the Argentinian star player Diego Maradona was closely guarded by the West German team, he assisted the decisive 3-2 scored by Jorge Burruchaga, ensuring his country's second World Cup win. Late during the match, three yellow cards were given to Argentinians for time wasting.

1990 World Cup Final v Argentina

For this re-match of the 1986 Final, Argentina played extremely defensively. Defender Pedro Monzón became the first player ever to receive a red card in a World Cup final, only to be joined by teammate Gustavo Dezotti 22 minutes later. Although West Germany was the dominating side with 23:1 shots, it is fitting that the rough match was decided by a penalty kick taken by Andreas Brehme.

Franz Beckenbauer achieved the feat to lose and then win a World Cup final each as player (1966, 1974) and manager (1986, 1990).

2002 World Cup Final v Brazil

With only one goal against during the six matches leading up to the final, hopes were on the German defence to withstand Brazil's star quality strikers. Germany's playmaker Michael Ballack was suspended for the final after picking his second yellow card of the tournament in the semi-final against South Korea. Two goals from Ronaldo in the middle of the second half decided the match in favour of the South Americans and ensured their record fifth title.

2014 World Cup Final v Argentina

Despite defeating host country Brazil 7–1, Germany was supported by the home fans due to Brazil's rivalry with Argentina. This record third match-up of two teams in World Cup finals saw good chances for both sides in regular time, but stayed goalless until substitute striker Mario Götze scored during the second half of extra time, in the 113th minute. The fourth title was the first since Germany's reunification in October 1990.

Record players

Lothar Matthäus is the FIFA World Cup's all-time record appearance maker. In addition, along with Antonio Carbajal and Rafael Márquez from Mexico, he is one of the few players to have been fielded in five FIFA World Cups.

Miroslav Klose, who is only one match behind, also holds the record for most victories at FIFA World Cups (17).

Top goalscorers

Since 2014, Miroslav Klose is the all-time top goalscorer at FIFA World Cup final tournaments. Gerd Müller used to be the holder of that record from 1974 until it was broken by Ronaldo in 2006.

By match

By opponent
A * indicates national team is now defunct

References

External links 
 DFB's German national football team page
 FIFA Official Ranking of all Participants at Finals 1930–2002. FIFA Match Results for all Stages 1930–2002
 FIFA official site

 
Countries at the FIFA World Cup
World Cup